Andy Cappelle (born 30 April 1979) is a Belgian former professional road cyclist.

Cappelle retired at the end of the 2013 season, after thirteen years as a professional.

Palmarès

1999
 1st  National Under-23 Road Race Championships
2000
 1st  National Under-23 Road Race Championships
 5th Omloop van het Houtland
2001
 6th Overall Tour of Japan
2002
 1st GP Stad Vilvoorde
 3rd Duo Normand
 3rd Brussel–Ingooigem
 3rd Kampioenschap van Vlaanderen
 7th Grand Prix Eddy Merckx
2003
 1st Egmond-pier-Egmond
 2nd Omloop van het Waasland
2006
 2nd Internatie Reningelst
 3rd Nationale Sluitingsprijs
 5th Boucles de l'Aulne
 9th Overall Driedaagse van West-Vlaanderen
2007
 1st Egmond-pier-Egmond
 1st Sparkassen Giro Bochum
 1st Stage 3 Regio-Tour
 2nd Kampioenschap van Vlaanderen
 2nd Grand Prix d'Isbergues
 5th Internatie Reningelst
 6th Overall Paris–Corrèze
 7th Memorial Rik Van Steenbergen
 9th Overall Tour de Wallonie
2008
 10th Overall Driedaagse van West-Vlaanderen
2009
 7th Grand Prix de Pérenchies
 8th Duo Normand
2010
 1st Polynormande
 1st Stage 3 Rhône-Alpes Isère Tour
 2nd Ronde van Drenthe
 2nd Ronde van Overijssel
 7th Dwars door Drenthe
 8th Halle–Ingooigem
2011
 2nd Overall La Tropicale Amissa Bongo
2012
1st  Sprints classification Three Days of De Panne
2nd Kustpijl

References

External links

1979 births
Living people
Belgian male cyclists
Sportspeople from Ostend
Cyclists from West Flanders